CD2-associated protein is a protein that in humans is encoded by the CD2AP gene.

Function 

This gene encodes a scaffolding molecule that regulates the actin cytoskeleton. The protein directly interacts with filamentous actin and a variety of cell membrane proteins through multiple actin binding sites, SH3 domains, and a proline-rich region containing binding sites for SH3 domains. The cytoplasmic protein localizes to membrane ruffles, lipid rafts, and the leading edges of cells. It is implicated in dynamic actin remodeling and membrane trafficking that occurs during receptor endocytosis and cytokinesis. Haploinsufficiency of this gene is implicated in susceptibility to glomerular disease.

Interactions 

CD2AP has been shown to interact with:
 Cbl gene, 
 NPHS2, 
 Nephrin,  and
 RAB4A.

See also 
 Focal segmental glomerulosclerosis

References

Further reading

External links